Alex Vallauri (born Alessandro Vallauri; Asmara, Ethiopia, 9 October  1949São Paulo, 27 March 1987) was a Brazilian artist of Italian origin. Vallauri is a pioneer of street art and graffiti in the country.

Biography 

Vallauri came to Brazil with his family, establishing first in seaside town of Santos  - where he trained the technique of engraving -depicting people in the port of Santos - and later to the state capital.  In 1965 he graduated in Visual Communication at the Fundação Armando Alvares Penteado (institution in which a few years later he  taught drawing). In 1975 he went to Stockholm, Sweden to specialize in Graphic Arts at Litho Art Center. Returning to Brazil in 1977, Vallauri continued to graffiti in public spaces, this time on the walls of São Paulo. At the same time studied new ways of engraving applications, such as xerography.

Between 1982 and 1983  Vallauri went to New York to study graphic arts at the Pratt Institute. There, he met Andy Warhol, Jean-Michel Basquiat and Keith Haring.   Returning to Brazil, he goes teach at FAAP. He participated in the 18th Bienal de São Paulo in 1985, with an installation, featuring his work Festa da Rainha do Frango Assado (Roasted Chicken Queen Party) and his work deserved retrospective at the Museu da Imagem e do Som in 1998.

Vallauri died of AIDS on March 27, 1987.

Art
A pioneer in the art of graffiti in Brazil, Alex used other media besides the urban walls; he stamped shirts, badges and stickers. For him, graffiti is a form of communication that most closely matches his ideal of art for all. His preferred technique was stencilling. One of his recurring stencils was a high-heeled black boot (Bota Preta).

His interest in kitsch objects made him in the mid-1970s, spent photographing tile panels painted in the 1950s and pasted on the walls of restaurants in São Paulo. His photographic records resulted in the video Arte Para Todos, shown at the International São Paulo Biennial in 1977.

Bibliography
 " Alex Vallauri Graffiti", João j. Spinelli, Editora Bei, 2010, Brasil.

References

1949 births
1987 deaths
AIDS-related deaths in São Paulo (state)
Brazilian artists
Brazilian people of Italian descent
Street artists
20th-century Brazilian painters
20th-century Brazilian male artists